Prayaag Akbar an Indian journalist and novelist. He is the former deputy editor of Scroll.in and was a reporter for Outlook magazine. He has written for publications including Indian Express and Caravan, covering issues of caste, class, and politics.

His debut novel, Leila was shortlisted for The Hindu Literary Prize. It won the Crossword Jury Prize and Tata Literature First Book Award. In February 2018, Netflix announced that it would be developing a series based on the novel.  

He is currently a professor of literature at Krea University.

Life
Prayaag studied economics at Dartmouth College and comparative politics at the London School of Economics, and spent a year at Routledge as a publicity assistant. His father is M.J. Akbar, former Minister of State for External Affairs.

Novels
 Leila (2017)

References

Living people
1982 births
21st-century Indian male writers
People from Kolkata
Dartmouth College alumni
Indian male journalists
Indian male novelists
Indian columnists
Writers from Kolkata
21st-century Indian novelists
Indian speculative fiction writers
Indian editors